Nehru Memorial Government College, Hansi is a public funded college located in Hansi in the Indian state of Haryana. It lies on Hansi Barwala bypass road to the east of the college. The college offers undergraduate and post-graduate courses in arts, science, commerce, business, computer and electronics.

See also 
 Hisar district
 List of Universities and Colleges in Hisar
 List of schools in Hisar
 List of institutions of higher education in Haryana

References

External links 
 Official website

Education in Hisar district
Universities and colleges in Haryana